The International Racquetball Federation's 21st Racquetball World Championships were held at the La Loma Centro Deportivo in San Luis Potosi, Mexico from August 20-27, 2022.

Tournament format
The 2022 World Championships used a two-stage format to determine the World Champions. Initially, players competed in separate groups over three days. The results were used to seed players for an elimination round. The individual events were followed by a team competition with countries competing head to head in best of three matches: two singles matches and a doubles match.

Medal table

Individual events

Men's singles

Women's singles

Men's doubles

Women's doubles

Mixed doubles

Team events

The team competition occurred after the individual events, and results from those events were used to seed countries for the team event. The team competition was a best of three matches: two singles and a doubles match. The order of the matches varied by round.

Men’s Team

Semi-finals

Final

Women’s Team

Semi-finals

Final

Overall Team Standings

References

External links
IRF website

Racquetball World Championships
Racquetball in Mexico
Racquetball competitions